The 2015 Meiji Yasuda J2 League (2015 明治安田生命J2リーグ) season was the 44th season of the second-tier club football in Japan and the 17th season since the establishment of J2 League. The season began on 8 March 2015 and ended on 23 November 2015.

Clubs
Shonan Bellmare have stayed in the second division for just a year, winning promotion as the champions. Matsumoto Yamaga have spent only 3 seasons in J2 after promoted from Japan Football League in 2012, becoming the first club based in Nagano Prefecture which have promoted to the top flight. Sixth-placed Montedio Yamagata won the promotion playoffs and will return in the first division after playing in the J2 for 3 years. Tokushima Vortis were relegated from the J1 immediately after their inaugural promotion, while Cerezo Osaka and Omiya Ardija have suffered relegation respectively after five and ten years from their last presence in J2.

On the other end of the table, Zweigen Kanazawa have been promoted from 2014 J3 League as the champions of the inaugural season of the J3 League, replacing relegated Kataller Toyama.

The participating clubs are listed in the following table:

Managerial changes

Foreign players

League table

Results

Play-offs

J1 Promotion Playoffs
2015 J.League Road To J1 Play-Offs (2015 J1昇格プレーオフ)

Semifinals

Final

Avispa Fukuoka was promoted to J1 League.

J3 Relegation Playoffs
2015 J2/J3 Play-Offs (2015 J2・J3入れ替え戦)

|}

Oita Trinita was relegated to J3 League.Machida Zelvia was promoted to J2 League.

Top scorers

Updated to games played on 23 November 2015Source: Meiji Yasuda J2 League Stats & Data - Ranking:Goals

Attendances

References

J2 League seasons
2
Japan
Japan